The Naval Nuclear Power Training Command (NNPTC) is a program element of the Naval Nuclear Propulsion Program and is responsible for educating enlisted and commissioned personnel of the US nuclear naval program. NNPTC's mission is to train officer and enlisted students in science and engineering fundamental to the design, operation, and maintenance of naval nuclear propulsion plants. NNPTC houses Nuclear Field "A" School and Naval Nuclear Power School.  These two schools were formerly independent entities run by separate commanding officers and structures.  NNPTC was created in 1993 to streamline the command structures of both schools, with each school ultimately reporting to a single commanding officer of NNPTC.

History of locations and commanding officers 
NNPTC was originally created when the two schools were located at the former Naval Training Center Orlando (Florida).  The NNPTC's first commanding officer was Captain Steven G. Slaton (USN Ret), who was the commanding officer of Nuclear Field "A" School when NNPTC was created in 1993.

When NNPTC graduated its final class in Orlando, in December 1998, the organization moved to Naval Weapons Station Charleston in Goose Creek, South Carolina, which is a suburban community of Charleston, South Carolina.

Time capsule 
In 1989, NNPTC buried a time capsule on their grounds. On 22 September 2014, it was dug up to reveal its contents: an old NNPTC command ball cap, a command name tape, multiple newspapers from that day, and other unidentified items.

See also
Naval Nuclear Propulsion Program
Naval Nuclear Power School

References 

1993 establishments in Florida
Shore commands of the United States Navy
Education in Goose Creek, South Carolina
Education in Orlando, Florida
Governmental nuclear organizations
Military units and formations established in 1993
Military units and formations in Florida
Military units and formations in South Carolina
Nuclear technology in the United States